Furneux Pelham or Furneaux Pelham  is a village and civil parish in Hertfordshire, England. The village is one of the Pelhams, part of an early medieval larger swathe of land known as Pelham including Brent Pelham to the north and Stocking Pelham to the east and north-east.

The village is largely linear covering much of the width of the parish from east to west and is buffered by gently sloped fields with some woodland to all sides.

Landmarks

The village has a church, St Mary the Virgin, with a medieval carved wooden roof which was restored and elaborately painted in the 1960s by the artist John Norbury. The spire has the motto "Time Flies, Mind your Business'" on the clock. Furneux Pelham has a large pub the Brewery Tap opposite the site of the former Rayments Brewery. A central cluster of 11 homes is pre-Edwardian and listed around one of the village's three-ways junctions accompanied by later houses in more basic and some in a similar style.

Furneux Pelham Hall

Furneux Pelham Hall has parts dating from the 18th century and is Grade II* listed, the middle category of listed building under the national statutory preservation scheme for buildings and their setting.  Furneux Pelham Hall has two barns dating to the seventeenth and eighteenth century with some farmland to the west.  It is late sixteenth century with later modifications and listed in the middle category of listed buildings. It has distinctive half-free gable ends with small attic windows inbuilt with intermittent square-moulded brick labels to resemble stone, along with a dark brick façade and large contrasting white nineteenth-century wood-barred and transomed casements around the windows.  Its main staircase dates from the late seventeenth century as does the wood panelling, as well as from the century earlier.

In the far south-east Hixham Hall, a farm and from its name implying a former lesser manor, has a granary and barn which are of seventeenth-century timber-framed construction, initial category but rare listed buildings in the home counties of this type and date.

Barleycroft End and East End
The village street progresses east into these localities of Furneux Pelham.

History
Pelham undivided in the Domesday book of 1086 appears as one key holding of that survey and six others. It contained 105 households and was assessed as worth 12.3 geld/gold units (very large) taxable at 3.3 geld units.  To its lord in 1066 its people rendered £6 per year; then one less in 1086 (£5).  Its main holding counted (as men or other heads of household) 7 villagers, 7 smallholders, 1 slave, 1 priest and 6 cottagers recorded in the national survey, 7 ploughlands, 3 lord's plough teams, 4 men's plough teams, meadow of 2.5 ploughlands, woodland worth 100 pigs.
Its Lords in 1066 were five freemen and one thane as feudal tenants holding of Almer of Bennington; King Edward and Eskil of Ware.  Its replacement lords by 1086 were two men-at arms holding of the Bishop of London (St Paul's).

In the nineteenth century the economy remained very agricultural, with large families occupying fewer buildings and few of the other industries, retired economic sector and broad-based businesses seen today.

The former brewery of the village was built in 1860 by William Rayment and when it was purchased by Greene King in 1928 it had an estate of 35 public houses. The brewery closed in 1987 while supplying, optionally with other Greene King competing ales, 27 public houses with its one remaining beer, Rayments BBA.

A murder took place of retired Lieutenant-Colonel Robert Riley Workman on 7 January 2004.  The former gamekeeper who committed the murder later confessed while in prison for another murder and was sentenced to a minimum of 32 years in November 2012.

See also
The Hundred Parishes
List of places in England with counterintuitive pronunciations: A–L

References

External links

 The Brewery Tap website

 
Villages in Hertfordshire
Civil parishes in Hertfordshire
East Hertfordshire District